David Kämpf (born 12 January 1995) is a Czech professional ice hockey forward currently playing for the Toronto Maple Leafs of the National Hockey League (NHL).

Playing career
Undrafted, Kämpf played as a youth within local club, Piráti Chomutov since 2009 at the under-16 level. He made his senior professional debut in the Czech Extraliga playing with Chomutov, during the 2012–13 season. In his fifth season with Piráti Chomutov, Kämpf had his most successful regular season in 2016–17, establishing a career high 15 goals and 31 points in 52 games.

On 19 April 2017, despite reported NHL interest Kämpf used his option to re-sign to an additional one-year deal with Chomutov. However, on 1 May 2017, Kämpf agreed to use an out-clause on his contract in agreeing to a two-year, entry-level contract with the Chicago Blackhawks.

During the  season, Kämpf played his first NHL game on 28 December 2017, and he scored his first NHL goal to help beat the Winnipeg Jets 2–1 on 12 January 2018.

As a free agent from the Blackhawks after four seasons with the club, Kämpf agreed to a two-year, $3 million contract to join the Toronto Maple Leafs on 28 July 2021.

Career statistics

Regular season and playoffs

International

References

External links

 David Kämpf - Hokej.cz 

1995 births
Living people
Chicago Blackhawks players
Czech ice hockey forwards
People from Jirkov
Piráti Chomutov players
Rockford IceHogs (AHL) players
Toronto Maple Leafs players
Undrafted National Hockey League players
Sportspeople from the Ústí nad Labem Region
Czech expatriate ice hockey players in Canada
Czech expatriate ice hockey players in the United States